Shibaji is a Bengali film Directed by Babu Ray.

Plot
The story of this film revolves around the main character Shivaji (Prosenjit) who is a goon. He was hired by the villain Bishal Sarkar to kill the judge Prasanta Mullick (Ranjit Mallick) as he refuses to receive the bribe and announces death sentence for his youngest brother, Vicky Sarkar. Shivaji's wife Durga (Swastika Mukherjee) on the other hand being insulted and humiliated again and again by people tries to commit suicide. Shivaji ultimately saves her life and leaves all criminal activities. Prasanta Mullick and his wife (Mousumi Saha) help him to start a business of a fast-food centre. But one day Bishal Sarkar's brother along with goons attack the restaurant and kills a person. Inspector Satyaprakash (Tapas Paul) arrests innocent Shivaji and he was imprisoned. Prasanta Mullick resigns from the post of a judge, and tries to prove Shivaji innocent. In this mean time the three brothers of Bishal Sarkar attacks Shivaji's house, kills his daughter Tumpa and rapes his wife. Durga commits suicide. To seek revenge Shivaji escapes from the police custody and starts killing Bishal Sarkar's brothers one by one. He also kidnaps Insp. Satyaprakash's daughter Jaya (Tathoi). Jaya was a lonely child as her father and mother (Satabdi Roy) none has time for her. She was brought up by her Appa (Chumki Choudhury). Shivaji starts loving her as his daughter, and Jaya also forgets her loneliness. But police separated them and produces Shivaji in court. Suddenly Bishal Sarkar kidnaps Jaya and Shivaji saves her. But while doing so he gets injured though kill all villains. Doctors declare him dead but Tathoi or Jaya magically saves his life by singing in front of God and after 20 years with the marriage of Jaya the movie ends.

Cast
Prosenjit Chatterjee as Shibaji
Tathoi Deb 
Swastika Mukherjee
Tapas Paul
Satabdi Roy
Ranjit Mallick
Saibal Banerjee

References

www.telegraphindia.com review
www.screenindia.com review
 sify.com review

2008 films
2000s Bengali-language films
Bengali-language Indian films